Kazi Jalil Abbasi (1912-1996) was a freedom fighter and member of the 7th Lok Sabha and the 8th Lok Sabha of India. He also represented the Domariaganj constituency of Uttar Pradesh and was a member of the Indian National Congress (I).

Early life and education
Abbasi holds BA & LL.B degrees and is educated in Aligarh Muslim University, Arabic College (Delhi) and Lucknow University. In 1937, Jalil was expelled from Aligarh Muslim University for being involved in political activities.

On 17 December 1940, he was arrested in Lucknow under section 38 of Defense of India Rules.
and was also a great writer as well. His autobiography "Kya din the" gives a detailed account of his life.

Posts held

See also
List of members of the 15th Lok Sabha of India

References

External links 
Kya Din They-Kazi Jalil's Autobiography published by him in 1985-Presentation: Rashid Ashraf

India MPs 1980–1984
India MPs 1984–1989
1996 deaths
1912 births
20th-century Indian Muslims
People from Basti district
Uttar Pradesh MLAs 1962–1967
Uttar Pradesh MLAs 1969–1974
Lok Sabha members from Uttar Pradesh
Indian independence activists from Uttar Pradesh
Indian National Congress politicians from Uttar Pradesh
Prisoners and detainees of British India
Hindi-language writers